Lake Mohawk is a reservoir in the U.S. state of Mississippi.

Lake Mohawk was named after the Mohawk people.

References

Bodies of water of Prentiss County, Mississippi
Bodies of water of Tippah County, Mississippi
Mohawk
Mississippi placenames of Native American origin